Bjørn Tore Bryn (1936 – 2014) was a Norwegian news anchor and radio personality.

He hailed from Trysil. In the 1960s he was a news anchor in Dagsrevyen, the main newscast of the Norwegian Broadcasting Corporation, at that time the only television channel in Norway. In 1973 he was hired in the Norwegian Broadcasting Corporation district office in Hedmark/Oppland in 1981 Hedmark was demerged with the head office being in Elverum. He was on the editorial staff, and worked with district and national radio. He died in 2014.

References

1936 births
2014 deaths
People from Trysil
NRK people
Norwegian television news anchors
Norwegian radio personalities